Rana Okuma (born 23 December 1998) is a Japanese professional footballer who plays as a forward for WE League club Omiya Ardija Ventus.

Club career 
Okuma made her WE League debut on 12 September 2021.

References 

Living people
1998 births
Japanese women's footballers
Women's association football forwards
Association football people from Saitama Prefecture
Omiya Ardija Ventus players
WE League players